Troude is a French surname originating in Normandy. It may refer to
 Amable Troude (1762–1824), a counter admiral
 Amable-Emmanuel Troude (1803–1885), his son, colonel and lexicographer
 Onésime-Joachim Troude (1807–1886), his son, frigate captain and writer
 Laurent Troude (1968–2018), a journalist

 , a group of protected cruisers